Cyrtodactylus adorus is a species of gecko endemic to Queensland in Australia.

References

Cyrtodactylus
Reptiles described in 2011
Taxa named by Patrick J. Couper